Brenton Pomery (born 11 March 1973), is an Australian former professional rugby league footballer who played in the 1990s and 2000s. He played for the North Sydney Bears from 1995 to 1996, the Western Suburbs Magpies from 1998 to 1999, the Wests Tigers in 2000 and finally the Melbourne Storm from 2000 to 2001.

Playing career
Pomery made his first grade debut for Norths against Newcastle in the 1995 qualifying final which Newcastle won 20–10.

In 1996, Pomery played 14 games as Norths made the preliminary final against St George with Pomery playing in the match.  St George went on to win 29-12 after narrowly leading 7–6 at half time.  This was the club's 3rd preliminary final defeat in 6 years.

In 1998, Pomery joined Western Suburbs and was part of the 1998 and 1999 sides which claimed back to back wooden spoons after coming last.  In 2000, Pomery joined the Wests Tigers and played 1 game for the new club and then made a mid season switch joining defending premiers Melbourne.  Pomery's final game in first grade was a 32–28 loss against North Queensland in Round 2 2001.  Pomery is one of the few players to have gone his whole first grade career without scoring a try.

References

1973 births
Living people
Australian rugby league players
Melbourne Storm players
North Sydney Bears players
Rugby league players from Sydney
Rugby league props
Rugby league second-rows
Wests Tigers players
Western Suburbs Magpies players